Kenneth Carr may refer to:

 Kenny Carr (born 1955), American basketball player
 Kenneth Monroe Carr (1925–2015), chairman of the Nuclear Regulatory Commission
 Kenny Carr (guitarist), American jazz guitarist